Fiscal memory devices are electronic devices used to record sales tax owed to a country. They are widely used in many countries around the world,  including Russia, Bulgaria, Serbia, Romania, Republic of Macedonia, Albania, Argentina, Poland, Moldova, Bosnia and Herzegovina, Kazakhstan, Armenia, Georgia, Kenya, Tanzania, Malawi and Ethiopia. Fiscal memory devices have the following categories:
 Electronic cash registers, fiscal cash registers
 Printers, fiscal printers
 E-Signs, electronic signature devices

All such devices contain fiscal memory: a piece of equipment that connects to a sales point terminal and records taxation for public revenue. Fiscal memory is a memory device that is certified by an appropriate government body. This encrypted module is usually in the form of an integrated circuit on a printer or cash register's printed circuit board.

An electronic journal is a kind of encrypted memory module that is readable using the fiscal device (ETR, FP). These memory modules are based on SD and Micro SD cards but feature an encrypted format to prevent tampering or unauthorized access. Once this electronic journal is initialized in a fiscal device, it is assigned a fiscal serial number to prevent it from being reused in another fiscal device.

Countries using fiscal memory devices

Distribution and categorization

The use of fiscal devices worldwide can be divided into three generations of technology:
 Offline-operating electronic fiscal devices with built-in fiscal memory (so-called first-generation fiscal devices);
 Electronic fiscal devices with Internet connection capabilities to the revenue authority central server (so-called second-generation fiscal devices);
 Electronic fiscal devices with Internet connection capabilities and various encryption methods for digital signing of each issued receipt (third-generation fiscal devices).

First generation fiscal devices had certain disadvantages (i.e.: easy manipulation, lack of control from the tax office, no printing of fiscal receipts, etc.), due to the limitations of technology and infrastructure when they were developed.  This has made the second generation fiscal devices increasingly popular, and many countries are changing their fiscal requirements and moving to Internet-enabled fiscal devices (often using GPRS network) and implementing the so-called online Information and Tax Collection System.

Second-generation fiscal devices eliminated most of the problems associated with their predecessors. Second generation fiscal cash registers and fiscal printers are connected through the Internet to the tax agency's central server and send their reports and/or fiscal receipts in predefined time intervals. However, these devices contain substantial flaws that leave room for exploitation, such as the printing of fake fiscal receipts, manipulation of daily reports, etc.

Third generation fiscal devices have been introduced in several countries. Devices of this kind are very similar to the second generation devices, but with additional software security used for the digital signing of fiscal receipts. These third-generation fiscal devices eliminate all previously known issues and give additional security to the tax agencies that employ them. Each fiscal receipt is digitally signed using a unique signature printed either in the form of a 2D bar code or various characters depending on the agency's rules regarding encryption. This allows the tax agency to easily authenticate these receipts.

References

Tax